Lautaro Arellano (born 17 April 1997) is an Argentine footballer who plays as a midfielder for River Plate.

Club career 

Arellano is a youth exponent from River Plate. He made his league debut on 8 November 2015 against Newell's Old Boys.

References

1997 births
Living people
Association football midfielders
Argentine footballers
Club Atlético River Plate footballers
Argentine Primera División players